Timur Mingaliyevich Rakhmatullin (born 24 February 1983) is a former Russian professional football player.

Club career
He played in the Russian Football National League for FC Sodovik Sterlitamak in 2007.

External links
 
 
 
 http://rus-cup.ru/players/4684-Rahmatullin-Timur-Mingalievich.html
 Profile by Sportbox
 http://transfer-markt.ru/player/rakhmatullin-timur/

1983 births
Living people
Russian footballers
Association football goalkeepers
FC Sodovik Sterlitamak players
FC Chita players